H E Tancred Stakes is an Australian Turf Club Group 1 Weight for Age Thoroughbred horse race for horses three years old and older, run over 2,400 metres at Rosehill Gardens Racecourse in Sydney, Australia. The prize money for the event is A$1,500,000.

History

The race is named after Henry Eugene Tancred (1897–1961), a former Chairman of the Sydney Turf Club.

Name
This race has had several names in its existence:

 1963–1976 - H E Tancred Cup
 1977–1980 - H E Tancred Stakes
 1981–1989 - Tancred Stakes
 1990 - The BMW International Stakes
 1991–1995 - The BMW Stakes
 1996–2001 - Mercedes Classic 
 2002–2017 - The BMW
 2018 onwards - Tancred Stakes

Distance

 1963 -  miles (~2400 metres)
 1964 -  miles (~2000 metres)
 1965–1972 -  miles (~2400 metres)
 1973 onwards - 2400 metres

Grade
 1963–1979 - Principal race
 1980 onwards - Group 1 race

Venue

2022 - Newcastle Racecourse

Winners

 2022 - Duais
2021 - Sir Dragonet
2020 - Verry Elleegant
2019 - Avilius
2018 - Almandin
2017 - Jameka
2016 - Preferment
 2015 - Hartnell
 2014 - Silent Achiever
 2013 - Fiveandahalfstar
 2012 - Manighar
 2011 - Cedarberg
 2010 - Littorio
 2009 - Fiumicino
 2008 - Tuesday Joy
 2007 - Blutigeroo
 2006 - Eremein
 2005 - Makybe Diva
 2004 - Grand Zulu
 2003 - Freemason
 2002 - Ethereal
 2001 - Curata Storm
 2000 - Tie the Knot
 1999 - Tie the Knot
 1998 - Might and Power
 1997 - Octagonal
 1996 - Octagonal
 1995 - Stony Bay
 1994 - Miltak
 1993 - Kaaptive Edition
 1992 - Heroicity
 1991 - Dr. Grace
 1990 - Sydeston
 1989 - Our Poetic Prince
 1988 - Beau Zam
 1987 - Myocard
 1986 - Bonecrusher
 1985 - Alibhai
 1984 - Hayai
 1983 - Trissaro
 1982 - Prince Majestic
 1981 - Blue Denim
 1980 - Kingston Town
 1979 - Shivaree
 1978 - Hyperno
 1977 - Our Cavalier
 1976 - Major Battle
 1975 - Sovereign Yacht
 1974 - Knee High
 1973 - Apollo Eleven (NZ)
 1972 - Tails
 1971 - Natural Trump
 1970 - Bright Shadow
 1969 - Prince Grant  
 1968 - Khalekan  
 1967 - Indian Harvest  
 1966 - Striking Force  
 1965 - Galerus   
 1964 - King Roto   
 1963 - Maidenhead

See also
 List of Australian Group races
 Group races

External links
 First three placegetters H E Tancred Stakes (ATC)

References

Group 1 stakes races in Australia
Open middle distance horse races
Sports competitions in Sydney